Sourp Magar ( or Magaravank, Մակարավանք) is an Armenian monastery located in a forested valley in the Pentadaktylos range in Cyprus. It is de facto located in Northern Cyprus. The Magaravank stands at 530 metres and is about 3 km from the Halevga Forest Station. In addition to its historical interest as a centre of Armenian culture, Sourp Magar is noted for its picturesque location and distant views of the Mediterranean and the mountains in Anatolia. The monastery had close ties with the Armenian Catholicosate of Cicilia, located in Antelias, Lebanon.

History

Magaravank was founded in the early eleventh century and at that time seems to have belonged to the Coptic Orthodox Church. It was dedicated to Saint Macarius of Alexandria who died in 395 AD. Of the Coptic history of Sourp Magar nothing is known, but sometime before 1425 the monastery was transferred to the Armenians in Cyprus. Armenians had long been resident in Cyprus, but their numbers increased substantially after fall of the Armenian Kingdom of Cilicia in 1375 when its last king Leo V escaped the Mamlukes. The crown of the Kingdom of Armenia subsequently passed to the Lusignan rulers of Cyprus. Armenians continued to migrate to Cyprus as Turkic peoples entered Anatolia and established powerful kingdoms there in the fourteenth and fifteenth centuries. The transfer of Sourp Magar to the Armenians was probably occasioned by these events and the increasing importance of the Armenian community in the Lusignan kingdom.

The Armenians retained control of Sourp Magar and its lands under Venetian and Ottoman rule. In the Ottoman Era, it was often called the Blue Monastery on account of the colour of the doors and windows. In 1642, at the time of Ibrahim I, the establishment was exempted from taxes. This exemption was renewed in 1660 and 1701. Restoration work is recorded to have been undertaken in 1735 and again in 1814, when the larger of the two chapels was reconstructed. Sourp Magar has, over its long history, served a wide range of social functions, from a school and rest-house for pilgrims to an orphanage and summer retreat for the Armenians of Nicosia. Some people lived on-site full-time, a report made in 1935 noting that 17 people resided there. Sourp Magar once housed a collection of manuscripts and other sacred items, but these were re-located to the Holy See of Cilicia in 1947. After the 1974 Turkish invasion, the Armenian community could no longer maintain custodians at Sourp Magar and the complex fell into ruins. Armenians nonetheless retain great attachment to their ancient establishment. Thanks to the efforts of Armenian Cypriot MP Vartkes Mahdessian, three pilgrimages have been made there, the last of which took place on 9 May 2010.

Complex
The Sourp Magar consists of an irregular rectangle of two-storied residential buildings constructed around a generous precinct. The site overall slopes gently from west to east. Two small churches or chapels, standing in the north-east part of the central courtyard, stand side-by-side. The largest chapel, with its vault still in place, was built in 1814. The chapels appear to be the vestiges of the side aisles of a fairly large church, the nave of which has more or less disappeared. This nave is represented by a large arch (rebuilt) and the common vestibule between the two chapels. The antiquity of the apses is indicated by the masonry which is close to the eleventh-century parts of the churches at Lythrangomi and Aphendrika on the Karpass Peninsula. The Aphendrika churches have been dated on good authority to the eleventh century and appear to have suffered a similar fate, being ruined by earthquakes in the thirteenth or fourteenth century 

The line of residential buildings facing towards the north and east probably belong to the fifteenth century judging from the shape and style of the Gothic windows and doors. One window has a chevron design, a characteristic feature of later Gothic building in Cyprus (as well old Coptic Cairo). These building were probably put up when the Armenians first took possession of the site. Internally, the buildings are two-storied, with a simple arcade below and a walkway above. The walkway was originally edged by stone posts with wooden lintels. The roofs throughout rested on wooden beams and were covered with curved tiles.

The residential buildings at Sourp Magar are extremely important for the history of architecture in Cyprus, being the best-preserved and most extensive examples of late medieval domestic building on the island, even in their ruined state. Camille Enlart (1862–1927), the doyen of Gothic architecture who visited Cyprus in the nineteenth century, did not mention Sourp Magar in his landmark volume, and the buildings, as a consequence, have not been received the recognition they deserve. The only architectural account was given by George H. Everett Jeffery who, writing in 1918, commented that the east side "retains its architectural character in richly moulded pointed arch windows ... and in a venerable doorway. A large room used as a guest chamber, with the roof supported on a central column at the north-east corner, is of the same date as the eastern façade."

From the 1920s modern tiles and other additions were added in many places, while the post-war period brought misguided rebuilding with reinforced concrete. One of the medieval windows had a concrete awning with steel I-beams inserted into it, evidently to provide a place for a toilet and bathroom. Part of the walkway floor in the interior was also rebuilt using reinforced concrete.

The 1974 Turkish invasion precipitated a degree of vandalism and the looting of the site for building materials. Many of the old roof tiles, now rendered valueless by recent prosperity, lie neatly stacked beside the outer walls. Most of the wooden rafters have disappeared. From 2005 the Turkish authorities rebuilt and re-roofed some rooms on the south side of the precinct with the idea of providing refreshments for forest trekkers and there was discussion of further developments. The project, however, has not been continued.

See also
 Armenians in Cyprus
 Notre Dame de Tyre

Notes

External links
 St. Magar Monastery
 Armenian Church in Nicosia

Armenian diaspora in Cyprus
Historic sites in Cyprus
Churches in Northern Cyprus
Armenian churches in Cyprus